Rushmoor is a village in the civil parish of Frensham, in the Waverley district, in the county of Surrey, England. In 2019 it had an estimated population of 880.

References 

Villages in Surrey
Borough of Waverley